Jason Ross is an American writer and seven-time Primetime Emmy Award for Outstanding Writing for a Variety Series winner.

Early life and education 
Ross grew up in Chico, California, in the 1970s and 80s and graduated from Chico Senior High School in 1988.  He attended the University of California, Santa Barbara, where he was a 1993 Collegiate Gold Circle Awards winner for his work at Daily Nexus.  He served as the news editor at Daily Nexus before being promoted to editor-in-chief and graduated from UCSB in 1993.

Career

Journalism 
Ross followed a journalism career and was a writer for his hometown Chico News & Review after college.

The Daily Show 
Ross joined The Daily Show in 2002, where he ended up spending 11 years, finally departing in June 2013.  As a staff writer, he was awarded seven Emmy Awards.

He also helped to write the show's two best-selling books, America and Earth.

Late Night with Jimmy Fallon 
Ross joined Late Night with Jimmy Fallon for the 2013–14 television season.

Personal life 
Ross currently lives in Los Angeles, California.  He is married to Nicole Revere and has two children.

References

External links 
 

American television writers
American male television writers
Living people
People from Chico, California
University of California, Santa Barbara alumni
Writers from New York City
Screenwriters from New York (state)
Screenwriters from California
Year of birth missing (living people)
21st-century American screenwriters
21st-century American male writers